Hoplomelas albolineelus is a species of beetle in the family Cerambycidae, and the only species in the genus Hoplomelas. It was described by Fairmaire in 1896.

References

Acanthocinini
Beetles described in 1896
Monotypic beetle genera